Sydney Charles Barr (23 September 1892 – 12 February 1969) was an Australian rules footballer who played with Essendon in the Victorian Football League (VFL).

Notes

External links 

1892 births
1969 deaths
Australian rules footballers from Victoria (Australia)
Essendon Football Club players
Australian military personnel of World War I